Kim Seung-pyo (born 1 October 1965) is a South Korean fencer. He competed in the individual and team foil events at the 1988 and 1992 Summer Olympics. He married fellow fencer Shin Seong-ja in 1993.

References

External links
 

1965 births
Living people
South Korean male foil fencers
Olympic fencers of South Korea
Fencers at the 1988 Summer Olympics
Fencers at the 1992 Summer Olympics
Asian Games medalists in fencing
Fencers at the 1986 Asian Games
Fencers at the 1990 Asian Games
Fencers at the 1994 Asian Games
Fencers at the 1998 Asian Games
South Korean foil fencers
Sportspeople from Gwangju
Asian Games gold medalists for South Korea
Asian Games silver medalists for South Korea
Asian Games bronze medalists for South Korea
Medalists at the 1986 Asian Games
Medalists at the 1990 Asian Games
Medalists at the 1994 Asian Games
Medalists at the 1998 Asian Games